The Knowledge Utilization Research Center is one of the Tehran University of Medical Sciences' research centers which works in the area of knowledge translation (KT).

Background
In 2006 the Knowledge Utilization Research Center began its work on Tehran University of Medical Sciences under the title of the 'KTE Study Group' in the 'Center of Academic and Health Policy'. In less than two years the center succeed in publishing more than 20 research paper in  national and international journals. In these years the center also run several research projects in the field of knowledge translation. In 2008 it was approved as a research center by the Ministry of Health and Medical Education (Iran).

Mission statement

The Knowledge Utilization Research Center aims to produce knowledge, localize it, and promote policies, methods and activities that lead to the better utilization of health knowledge in Iran. The goal of this center is to create change in health decision makers' behavior, i.e. to make decisions on the basis of scientific and research evidence on one hand, and to strengthen researchers' efforts in transferring research results on the other hand and improve their communicating environment.

To obtain these aims, center have some Strategies for its vision on 2014 based on People, Policy makers and managers, Health service providers, Researchers.

Achievements

Education
Workshops
The Knowledge Utilization Research center has designed and executed different workshops like Knowledge Transfer and Exchange, Adaptation of Clinical Guidelines,  Systematic Review and Meta Analysis  and  Economic Evaluation which held in national and international level (sponsored by the Regional Office of the Eastern Mediterranean (EMRO)).

Capacity Building
Researchers employed in the Knowledge Utilization Research center held  educational classes at the center periodically once a week and discuss about the latest articles and project results at the world.

Research
Self Assessment tool
The self-assessment tool for knowledge translation has been designed to assess the knowledge translation status in research organizations (Research centers, faculties and universities) by the center.

Website
To strengthen and create an appropriate environment for promoting the culture of knowledge translation, the center website has been designed in three languages of Persian, English and Arabic that includes various sections such as online learning, bank of ideas, newsletter etc.

KTE Newsletter
The Knowledge Translation newsletter is published monthly by the center to raise awareness in researchers and research users on knowledge translation.

Publications

Books
Knowledge Translation and Utilization of Research Results
Published in 2008 as a Persian book which is a review on knowledge translation models and theories and also an introduction to its methods.

Research Studies in Zone 17 Presented as a Narrative Image 
This booklet has been published to inform the community of the applied research studies conducted in Zone 17 of Tehran Municipality and has been presented as a narrative image and in lay language.

Articles
The results of KURC's research projects have been published in the form of papers in various national and international journals. These projects are designed in different areas of KT:
Knowledge Translation, models, tools and methods.
Knowledge Translation and researchers.
Knowledge Translation and research organizations.
Knowledge Translation and police makers.
Knowledge Translation and media

See also
Tehran University of Medical Sciences

References

External links
Prof. Reza Majdzadeh
Knowledge Utilization Research Center
Tehran University of Medical Sciences

University of Tehran
2008 establishments in Iran